McIntosh County is a county located in the U.S. state of Oklahoma. As of the 2010 census, the population was 20,252. Its county seat is Eufaula. The county is named for an influential Muscogee Creek family, whose members led the migration of the Lower Towns to Indian Territory and served as leaders for generations.

It is one of the counties within the jurisdiction of the federally recognized Muscogee (Creek) Nation; a small portion is within the jurisdiction of the Cherokee Nation of Oklahoma.

History
Many archaeological sites in McIntosh County date back to the Archaic period in North America (6000 BC - 1 AD). (Ed. note: the Encyclopedia of Oklahoma History and Culture defines this period as written here. The definition differs from that shown by the linked Wikipedia article.) Archaeologists have uncovered six sites since 2003 that predate these. These indigenous peoples predated any of Plains Indians, as well as the tribes that settled in the territory in the 1830s following Indian Removal from the American Southeast. Indigenous people may have made petroglyphs at the Handprint Site before the coming of the earliest European explorers.

In 1825, the Creek of the Lower Towns in the territory of present-day Georgia, led by William McIntosh, agreed by the Treaty of Indian Springs with the United States, to exchange their land in Georgia for land in Indian Territory. These Creek were a historic people who had originated in the Southeast and were part of the larger Creek Confederacy for centuries. Much of their new territory was included in what later became McIntosh County. Chief McIntosh was executed in Georgia in 1825 by order of the Creek National Council, which had forbidden such land cessions without agreement by the full council.

His descendants and followers of the Lower Towns migrated to Indian Territory. There the Creek repeatedly battled with the Osage, who had historically occupied a large area including this and up through present-day Missouri. In 1836, the Creek established North Fork Town on the Texas Road, about two miles east of present-day Eufaula, Oklahoma. A post office named Micco operated in North Fork Town from 1853 to 1886. This area became part of the Eufaula District of the Creek Nation.

Albert Pike, representing the Confederate States of America, signed treaties with the Chickasaw, Choctaw and Creek nations at the beginning of the Civil War. They allied with the Confederacy in the hopes of gaining an Indian state after the war. The Battle of Honey Springs, the largest battle of the war in what is now Oklahoma, was fought near Rentiesville. The Union Army won and took control of that part of Indian Territory north of the Arkansas River.

The Missouri-Kansas-Texas Railway built a line through this area in 1871–2, generally following the Texas Road. The communities of Checotah and Eufaula were established then. In 1904–5, the Missouri, Oklahoma and Gulf Railway (later merged into the Kansas, Oklahoma and Gulf Railway) laid a line through the northwestern part of the area, starting the community of Hitchita.

McIntosh County was established at statehood in 1907, when the population was 17,975. Before statehood, the area had been part of the Eufaula District of the Creek Nation. The county gained some land from Hughes County in 1915, but lost some land to Okmulgee County in 1918.  The former moved the community of Hanna from Hughes County. The latter moved the towns of Grayson and Hoffman into Okmulgee County.

Between 1907 and 1909, the people of Checotah were involved in a dispute with nearby Eufaula known as the McIntosh County Seat War. After Checotah was designated as the new county seat, the people of Eufaula refused to hand over the county records. Soon after, a group of heavily armed men from Chectotah attempted to seize the records from the courthouse in Eufaula, but were beaten back and forced to surrender during the gunfight that followed. Eufaula was designated as the permanent seat of McIntosh County one year later.

The county is mostly within the jurisdiction of the federally recognized Muscogee (Creek) Nation, which oversees and represents its members. The far eastern portion of the county is within the jurisdiction of the Cherokee Nation of Oklahoma. Native Americans, mostly Muscogee, comprise more than 16% of the county's population.

Geography
Much of the water surface is attributable to Eufaula Lake, the largest reservoir entirely within the state. Checotah is the nearest city to Lake Eufaula State Park (formerly Fountainhead State Park). The county is drained by the Deep Fork River, North Canadian River and Canadian River.

Major highways
  Interstate 40
  U.S. Highway 69
  U.S. Highway 266
  State Highway 9
  State Highway 72
  Indian Nation Turnpike

Adjacent counties
 Muskogee County (northeast)
 Haskell County (southeast)
 Pittsburg County (south)
 Hughes County (southwest)
 Okfuskee County (west)
 Okmulgee County (northwest)

Demographics

As of the census of 2000, there were 19,456 people, 8,085 households, and 5,683 families residing in the county.  The population density was 12/km2 (31/mi2).  There were 12,640 housing units at an average density of 8/km2 (20/mi2).  The racial makeup of the county was 72.59% White, 4.06% Black or African American, 16.20% Native American, 0.14% Asian, 0.03% Pacific Islander, 0.35% from other races, and 6.63% from two or more races.  1.27% of the population were Hispanic or Latino of any race. 96.4% spoke English, 1.5% Muskogee and 1.5% Spanish as their first language.

There were 8,085 households, out of which 25.60% had children under the age of 18 living with them, 56.60% were married couples living together, 10.40% had a female householder with no husband present, and 29.70% were non-families. 26.70% of all households were made up of individuals, and 14.50% had someone living alone who was 65 years of age or older.  The average household size was 2.37 and the average family size was 2.84.

In the county, the population was spread out, with 22.60% under the age of 18, 6.40% from 18 to 24, 22.30% from 25 to 44, 26.90% from 45 to 64, and 21.80% who were 65 years of age or older.  The median age was 44 years. For every 100 females there were 91.70 males.  For every 100 females age 18 and over, there were 89.30 males.

The median income for a household in the county was $25,964, and the median income for a family was $31,990. Males had a median income of $27,998 versus $19,030 for females. The per capita income for the county was $16,410.  About 13.50% of families and 18.20% of the population were below the poverty line, including 24.80% of those under age 18 and 13.30% of those age 65 or over.

The most common self-identified ancestry groups in McIntosh County are:

 24.9% English
 19.8% Irish
 15.8% German
 2.7% French

Politics
Despite a wide Democratic registration advantage, the county has not voted that way in presidential elections in the 21st century. The county was slower than most of its size to give large margins to national Republican candidates (Barack Obama still cracked 40% in 2008), but Donald Trump received 69.1% of the vote in 2016.

Economy
The county economy has been based primarily on farming and ranching. Corn was the principal crop until 1900, when cotton superseded it (as measured by acreage) around the middle of the 20th century. Other crops such as sorghum, oats and wheat also became important. However, construction of a dam and the resulting Eufaula Lake inundated much of the best cropland, causing a large-scale decline in agriculture. Cotton farming essentially ceased in the county by the mid 1970s. Cattle ranching has remained important, continuing to rise throughout the century. By 2000, the county reported 55,000 head of cattle.

Completion of Eufaula Lake in 1964 generated revenue from hydroelectric power, stimulated tourism, and produced companion businesses like boat building and general retail.

Mineral resources such as oil, natural gas, limestone, sand and gravel have also been important. While there are ample coal deposits, much of it has a high ash and sulfur content, so little except the low-sulfur type has been mined.

Communities

Cities
 Checotah
 Eufaula (county seat)

Towns
 Hanna
 Hitchita
 Rentiesville
 Stidham

Census-designated places
 Duchess Landing
 Shady Grove
 Texanna

Unincorporated communities
 Lenna
 Vernon

NRHP sites

The following sites in McIntosh County are listed on the National Register of Historic Places:

 Checotah Business District, Checotah
 Checotah City Hall, Checotah
 Checotah MKT Depot, Checotah
 C. L. Cooper Building, Eufaula
 Eufaula Armory, Eufaula
 Eufaula Business District, Eufaula
 First Soil Conservation District Dedication Site, Eufaula
 Honey Springs Battlefield, Rentiesville
 Johnson Lake Shelters, Warner
 McIntosh County Courthouse, Eufaula
 Methodist Episcopal Church, South, Checotah
 Oklahoma Odd Fellows Home at Checotah, Checotah
 Rock Front, Vernon
 Slippery Moss Shelter, Texanna
 Tabor House, Checotah

References

 
1907 establishments in Oklahoma
Populated places established in 1907